Borys Fedorenko (February 23, 1946 — January 29, 2012) was a Ukrainian painter. Member of National Union of Artists of Ukraine since 1985.

Works

Selected works

Museums 
 :uk:Кременчуцький краєзнавчий музей
 :uk:Корсунь-Шевченківська художня галерея
 Memorial museum of Ivan Piddubny, Bohoduhivka, Cherkasy Oblast
 :it:Pinacoteca civica Francesco Podesti
 :it:Pinacoteca comunale Donatello Stefanucci
 Palazzo Buonaccorsi
 East Slovak Gallery
 :de:Mußbach (Neustadt) museum
 Gemäldegalerie, Berlin
 Musée des beaux-arts de Bordeaux
 Private collections in Italy, Ukraine, Germany, Slovakia, Japan

Exhibitions

Solo

Republican

Collective

Awards 
 The First prize and Gold medal laureate in pan-European painting competition "Cingoli il lago e il cane" in Cingoli, Italy
 Awarded the badge uk:Знак пошани

Further reading 
 Dovidnyk chleniv Spilky hudozhnykiv Ukrayiny. Kyiv, 1998, p. 151
 N. Dyachenko. Polynte u svit prekrasnogo // Nadrossya, 6.02.2002
 P. Voytsekhivsky. Svit u zali Fedorenka // Democratychna Ukrayina, 14.05.2001
 N. Tykhopiy. Mytec // Lyubit Ukrayinu, 1999, №10, p. 2
 A. Bakhmut. Z Evropy — dodomu // Nadrossya, 25.12.1999
 L. Bilyakova. Ukrayinski hudozhnyky na slovackomu pleneri // Ukrayina. Evropa. Svit, 1998, №10-16
 O. Makarenko. Dotorknutys do krasy mystectva // Korsun, 23.03.2001
 Hto ye hto v ekonomyci, kulturi, nauci Kyiva. Kyiv, vol. 2, 2000-2001, p. 260

Catalogues 
 P. Voytsekhivsky. Borys Fedorenko. Kyiv, 1997
 Henri-Marie-Ludovic Vergne, Christian Jean dit Cazaux, Monique Dubern. Le Groupe Ukrain'Art presents des Peintres d' Ukraine avec la participation du Comite' d'Exposition de l'Union des Artistes d'Ukraine. Nouvel Hotel des Ventes — Bordeaux Rive Droite, 1993, p. 6
 Marcus Halliwell, Marguerite Higham. Soviet Realist  and Impressionist Paintings from Collection of Ray and Sue Johnson. Phillips, Son & Neale. — London,  1994, p. 78
 Comune di Sassoferrato, Universita degli Studi di Urbino, Regione Marche. XLV Rassegna "G.B. Salvi" e Premio Calzaturificio Vainer di Pittura Scultura Grafica Libro d'Artista Ex Libris Design Sculptura e Oreficeria Arazzi. — Sassoferrato, 1995, p. 45
 Medzinarodna Skupina Vytvarnikov na Slovensku. — Pres'ov, 1997, s. 3
 Jozef Cerepko. Druhy' Mezdina'rodny' Plene'r Vytvarnikov na Slovensku. — Pres'ov, 1998, s. 2

External links 
 Золотий фонд нації. Національні лідери України — Федоренко Борис Михайлович 
 Золотое сечение — Федоренко Бориc Михайлович 

Ukrainian painters
Ukrainian male painters
1946 births
2012 deaths